One-line sky or single-line sky refers to the landform of a narrow passage between huge rocks, where the sky looks like a single line. It is a word often used in China and the Chinese cultural sphere.

One-line sky is found in the following areas:
 Huangshan, Anhui Province 
 Wuyi Mountains, Fujian Province
 Shoushan, Kaohsiung, Taiwan

See also
Slot canyon

References

Landforms
Geography of China